Every Man His Own Cigar Lighter was a 1904 French short silent film by Georges Méliès.

Plot
An English tourist, sightseeing in Paris, wants to light his cigarette but does not have a match. He stops a passing coal deliverer and attempts to ask for a match, but cannot make himself understood. Rifling through all his pockets, the tourist finds one match, but it will not light, and another passerby also cannot help. Finally, the tourist splits himself into two identical Englishmen, one of whom lights the other's cigarette. The two doubles exit to have a drink together, linking arms and merging back into one man.

Production and release
Méliès played both the English tourist and his double, with both seen in the same frame by means of multiple exposure. Every Man His Own Cigar Lighter was one of several Méliès films featuring doubling, reflecting nineteenth-century Europe's fascination with the Doppelgänger; other such films include The Triple Lady (1898), The Triple Conjuror and the Living Head (1900), The Magic Lantern (1903), and Baron Munchausen's Dream (1911). Susan Daitch's 2011 novel Paper Conspiracies cites the film as a metaphor for "times when it's impossible to ask anyone for anything, all you can do is rely on yourself, split yourself in two".

The film was sold by Méliès's Star Film Company and is numbered 545 in its catalogues. A very brief fragment of the film survives, showing Méliès's character smoking in close-up. The rest is presumed lost.

References

External links
 

French black-and-white films
Films directed by Georges Méliès
French silent short films
1900s French films